Promise is a 2005 Finnish drama film directed by Ilkka Vanne.

Cast 
 Laura Birn - Mona Moisio
 Karoliina Vanne - Anna Moisio
 Pertti Sveholm - Helmer Moisio
 Miitta Sorvali - Lilli Moisio

External links 

2005 drama films
2005 films
Finnish drama films